Mount Elie de Beaumont is a  high mountain in the Southern Alps on the South Island of New Zealand and the northernmost Three-thousander of the country. It is surrounded by several glaciers like Johannes Glacier in the north, Burton Glacier to the east, Times Glacier to the west and Anna Glacier, a tributary to the Tasman Glacier, in the south. It was named by Julius von Haast after the french geologist Jean-Baptiste Élie de Beaumont.

References

Southern Alps
Elie de Beaumont